The Sentimental Swordsman is a 1977 Hong Kong wuxia film written and directed by Chor Yuen and produced by the Shaw Brothers Studio. It stars Ti Lung, Derek Yee, Ching Li, Yueh Hua, Fan Mei-sheng and Ku Feng. The film is based on Duoqing Jianke Wuqing Jian of Gu Long's Xiaoli Feidao Series of novels.

It was one of Shaw Brothers' highest grossing films in the studio's history, and it was followed by a sequel, Return of the Sentimental Swordsman, in 1981. An in-name-only "sequel", Perils of the Sentimental Swordsman, was released in 1982, with no relation to the main character of Little Flying Dagger Li, being based instead in the Lu Xiaofeng novel series (also by Gu Long), and its previous film adaptations.

Synopsis 
Due to his own extreme ideals, famed swordsman Li has lost everyone dear to him. After his life is saved by a rival swordsman, Li's overwhelming pride makes him forsake the woman he loves and lets her marry his saviour. Now resigned to traveling the country with his loyal aide, Li's only comfort is alcohol and the simple life he has now accepted. On one such journey, the lonely swordsman befriends the exceptionally skilled, yet secretive Fei who has his own pressures to contend with. Li then finds himself embroiled in a battle to own the highly prized 'gold armour shirt' — a protective vest that can withstand any blow.

As he discovers that many of the people he meets have a hidden agenda, Li realizes that Fei is the only man he can truly trust. This new friendship is put under a test when the 'sentimental swordsman' is hunted down by numerous hired killers and framed for a series of crimes he didn't commit. The person behind Li's troubles proves to be elusive, though all the clues seem to point to the legendary 'Plum Blossom Bandit', a disguised figure whose identity has long proved elusive to the martial world.

Cast 

 Ti Lung as Little Flying Dagger Li
 Ching Li as Lin Xian Er
 Derek Yee as Ah Fei
 Yueh Hua as Long Xiao Yun
 Candice Yu as Shi Yin
 Fan Mei-sheng as Chuan Jia
 Ku Feng as Zhao Zheng Yi
 Norman Chu as Iron Flute
 Ngai Fei as Iron Sword Tian Qi
 Yuen Wah as You Long Sheng
 Goo Man-chung as Gong Sun
 Cheng Miu as Shaolin abbot
 Yeung Chi-hing as Monk Xin Mei
 Ku Kuan-chung as Monk Xin Jian
 Chan Shen as Shaolin monk
 Wang Sha as Doctor Mei Er
 Shum Lo as Hua Feng
 Lee Sau-kei as Zhu Ge Lei
 Keung Hon as Golden Lion Escort man in blue
 Wong Pau-gei as Golden Lion Escort man
 Fung Hak-on as White Snake
 Alan Chui Chung-San as Black Snake
 San Kuai as Black Snake's man
 Yuen Yat-choh as Black Snake's man
 Brandy Yuen as Black Snake's man
 Wong Chi-keung as Black Snake's man
 Chan Kwok-kuen as Black Snake's man in yellow
 Lau Jun-fai as Black Snake's man / Yun's man
 Chiang Nan as 5 Poisons Kid with cold needle
 Fung Ging-man as 5 Poisons Kid's man with bun

 Cheung Chok-chow as 5 Poisons Kid's man selling bun
 Lui Hung as 5 Poisons Kid's woman with noodle
 Lo Wai as 5 Poisons Kid's man
 Wong Chi-ming as 5 Poisons Kid's man
 Chui Fat as 5 Poisons Kid's man
 Ng Hong-sang as Yun's invited hero
 Jamie Luk as Yun's invited hero
 Stephan Yip as Yun's invited hero
 Tang Tak-cheung as Yun's invited hero
 Yuen Cheung-yan as Yun's invited hero
 Wang Han-chen as Golden Palm Wang Chen
 Lam Ching-ying as Yun's man
 Chik Ngai-hung as Yun's man
 Liu Wai as Shen Lao San
 Yuen Bun as Shaolin disciple
 Chan Dik-hak as Shaolin disciple
 Law Keung as Shaolin disciple
 To Wing-leung as Shaolin monk
 Ting Tung as Huan's escort to Shaolin
 Sai Gwa-pau as cook
 Tsang Choh-lam as waiter
 Wong Kung-miu as waiter
 Fung Ming as restaurant customer
 Cheung Sek-au as restaurant customer
 Ng Yuen-fan
 Lau Wai-man
 Lam Choi
 Kong Chuen

See also 
 The Romantic Swordsman (1978 TV series)
 The Romantic Swordsman (1995 TV series)
 Flying Daggers

External links 
 
 

1977 films
1977 martial arts films
1970s action films
Hong Kong martial arts films
Hong Kong action films
Shaw Brothers Studio films
Wuxia films
Works based on Xiaoli Feidao (novel series)
Films directed by Chor Yuen
Films based on works by Gu Long
1970s Hong Kong films

ja:多情剣客無情剣